The Rhythmic chart debuted in Billboard Magazine in the issue dated October 3, 1992, as the Top 40/Rhythm-Crossover chart. Weekly rankings are "compiled from a national sample of airplay" as measured by Nielsen BDS monitoring rhythmic radios stations continuously.

At the start of the 2000s decade, the chart was called the Rhythmic Top 40 and was published in Airplay Monitor and online, available only to subscribers to Billboard. The chart returned to the print edition of Billboard Magazine in its August 2, 2003, issue. It was renamed to Rhythmic Airplay with the issue dated February 7, 2004. Since July 12, 2008, the chart has been called Rhythmic.

Below are the songs that reached number one on the chart beginning with the first new song to reach number one in 2000 through the end of 2009 in chronological order. The song to spend the most weeks at number one during the decade was "Lollipop" by Lil Wayne and featuring Static Major with a 12-week run.

Number-one rhythmic hits of the 2000s

See also
2000s in music
List of Billboard Hot 100 number-one singles of the 2000s
List of artists who reached number one on the U.S. Rhythmic chart

References

Lists of number-one songs in the United States
United States Rhythmic
2000s in American music